Wilbanks may refer to:

People with the surname 
 Don Wilbanks (19262013), American actor
 George D. Wilbanks (19312012), American cancer researcher, surgeon, and professor
 George Wilbanks (born 1958), American executive recruiter; son of George D. Wilbanks
 Hilliard A. Wilbanks (19331967), American officer and pilot in the United States Air Force
 Jennifer Carol Wilbanks (born 1973), American woman who orchestrated a kidnapping hoax in Georgia, United States, known as the 2005 runaway bride case   
 John Wilbanks, American medical director, known for his work on open science and research networks
 William Wilbanks (19402018), American criminologist and professor

Other 
 Mount Wilbanks, a mountain in Marie Byrd Land, Antarctica
 Wilbanks International, Inc., a subsidiary of CoorsTek
 Wilbanks Site, a Native American archaeological site in Georgia, United States

See also 
 
 Witbank, South Africa